Dave Cousins (born David Joseph Hindson; 7 January 1945) is an English former musician who was the leader, singer and most-active songwriter of Strawbs since 1967.

Cousins is a founder member of the Strawbs, which started out as the Strawberry Hill Boys, playing bluegrass music, then moved on to folk, folk rock, and progressive rock. He also performs as an acoustic duo with Strawbs guitarist Brian Willoughby, and as Acoustic Strawbs with Willoughby (until August 2004), Dave Lambert and Chas Cronk (since September 2004).

Biography
Cousins grew up in Chiswick, and in the 1970s returned to live there, rehearsing in Chiswick's Mawson Arms pub. He holds a degree in statistics and pure mathematics from the University of Leicester, and has also followed a career in radio. He was a producer for Denmark's Radio 1969–1979, was programme controller for Radio Tees (1980–1982), and the managing director of Devon Air in Devon (1982–1990). Since 1991, Cousins has been in charge of St. David's Research, and has been instrumental in many successful franchise applications business ventures involving local radio stations in the UK; stations such as Thames Radio (Kingston-upon-Thames), Radio Victory (Portsmouth) and XFM in London. He runs Witchwood Records, an independent record label. Cousins tours North America and Europe with Acoustic Strawbs, several months every year. In February 2012, a new venture with producer Chris Tsangarides was announced, the Dark Lord Records label; the first release was by band Spit Like This on 21 May. In 2014 Cousins' autobiography Exorcising Ghosts: Strawbs and Other Lives was published by Witchwood Media Limited.

In December 2021, Cousins announced a withdrawal from live performance due to his health.

Special appearances
In 1980, Cousins made a guest appearance on On Through the Night, the debut album by British heavy metal group Def Leppard.  Cousins' speaking voice can be heard at the beginning of "When the Walls Came Tumblin' Down", reciting a melancholy tale that serves as the track's intro.

Albums
 Two Weeks Last Summer (1972) (with Roger Glover, Rick Wakeman, Dave Lambert, etc)
 Old School Songs (1980) (with Brian Willoughby)
 The Bridge (1994) (with Brian Willoughby)
 Hummingbird (2002) (with Rick Wakeman)
 Wakeman and Cousins "Live 1988"  (2005) (with Rick Wakeman)
 High Seas (2005) (with Conny Conrad)
 The Boy in the Sailor Suit (2007)
 Secret Paths (2008)
 Duochrome (2008) (with Ian Cutler) live recordings from the US tour in March 2008
 Moving Pictures (2015) solo acoustic live recording from The Kent Stage, Kent, Ohio US 15 March 2008

See also
 Strawbs discography

References

External links
Dave Cousins at the official Strawbs website
 Official Strawbs website
 Witchwood Records website

1945 births
Living people
Appalachian dulcimer players
English male singers
English folk guitarists
English male guitarists
English songwriters
Alumni of the University of Leicester
People from Hounslow
Strawbs members
British male songwriters
People from Chiswick